Douglas Charles Edmeades  (born 1949) is a New Zealand soil scientist. He was involved in high-profile litigation in relation to the effectiveness of the Maxicrop brand of fertiliser.

Early life
Edmeades was born in 1949. Robert Harvey (1914–1985) and Ina (1917–2011) were his parents. The educationalist Cliff Edmeades is one of his elder brothers.

Academic career
After a Ph.D. from Lincoln College (awarded through Canterbury University due to Lincoln's status at the time) Edmeades worked for the Ministry of Agriculture and Fisheries at Ruakura and then AgResearch after the 1992 reorganisation which created Crown Research Institutes. He left in 1996 and now runs his own consultancy, agKnowledge Ltd.

In the 2013 Queen's Birthday Honours, Edmeades was appointed an Officer of the New Zealand Order of Merit, for services to agriculture.

Litigation
In 1989, while working for the Ministry of Agriculture and Fisheries,  Edmeades appeared on the TV show FairGo expressing the view that seaweed-based Maxicrop didn't work. Legal action was initiated by Maxicrop's New Zealand distributor, the Bell-Booth Group. In Bell-Booth Group Ltd v Attorney-General the Court of Appeal found for MAF and FairGo after 'the country's longest civil court case.'

Selected works
Widely cited peer review articles:
Edmeades, Douglas C. "The long-term effects of manures and fertilisers on soil productivity and quality: a review." Nutrient Cycling in Agroecosystems 66.2 (2003): 165–180.
Edmeades, D. C., D. M. Wheeler, and O. E. Clinton. "The chemical composition and ionic strength of soil solutions from New Zealand topsoils." Soil Research 23.2 (1985): 151–165.
Blamey, F. P. C., D. C. Edmeades, and D. M. Wheeler. "Role of root cation‐exchange capacity in differential aluminum tolerance of Lotus species." Journal of Plant Nutrition 13.6 (1990): 729–744.

Books:
Science friction : the Maxicrop case and the aftermath.

References

External links
 
 Personal homepage

Living people
New Zealand soil scientists
Officers of the New Zealand Order of Merit
Lincoln University (New Zealand) alumni
1949 births